The Kreuzberg is one of the Rhön Mountains in southern Germany. The Kreuzberg — also referred to as the "sacred mountain of the Franconians" — is near the town of Bischofsheim an der Rhön in the district Rhön-Grabfeld.

Tourism
The Kreuzberg draws a large number of tourists. People visit the Kreuzberg particularly for hiking and or to go skiing in the winter. To that end there are three ski lifts on the northern side of the mountain. In addition, there is also a luge track on the Kreuzberg.

Kreuzberg Monastery (Kloster Kreuzberg), which is situated just below the summit of the mountain, is one of the main attractions as well. There are frequent pilgrimages to the monastery church. The monastery is also famous for its beer, which was brewed on site by the monks until about 1992. Today the beer is brewed by laypersons under the supervision of the monks.  Three different beers (Dunkel, Pilsner and Hefe-Weizen) are produced year-round and a fourth (Weihnachts-Bock) is available during the Christmas season.  Approximately 8,500 hectoliters of beer are brewed each year at the monastery.  The current Braumeister ("brew master") is Ulrich Klebl.

Broadcasting
There is a facility for FM radio and TV broadcasting (the Kreuzberg transmitter) situated at 928 m AMSL on the Kreuzberg.

External links

 Monastery and brewery website 
 Kreuzberg Transmitter 
 
 

Mountains of Bavaria
Rhön-Grabfeld
Mountains and hills of the Rhön